Alan Miguel Barbero (born 28 October 1996) is an Argentine professional footballer who plays as a defender.

Career
Barbero began with Gimnasia y Esgrima. His first taste of senior football occurred in August 2015 when he was an unused substitute in a Primera B Nacional loss to Patronato, though he never played in 2015 which ended with relegation. His first appearances didn't arrive until 2017–18, with the defender featuring in Copa Argentina ties against Talleres and Olimpo before making his Torneo Federal A bow versus Unión de Villa Krause. Another appearance arrived in a win over Alvarado, as Gimnasia won promotion to Primera B Nacional. His first appearance in tier two came as they lost to Arsenal de Sarandí in 2019.

Career statistics
.

References

External links

1996 births
Living people
Sportspeople from Mendoza, Argentina
Argentine footballers
Association football defenders
Torneo Federal A players
Primera Nacional players
Gimnasia y Esgrima de Mendoza footballers